Boris Aronovich Khesin (in Russian: Борис Аронович Хесин, born in 1964) is a Russian and Canadian mathematician working on infinite-dimensional Lie groups, Poisson geometry and hydrodynamics. He is a professor at the University of Toronto.

Khesin obtained his Ph.D. from Moscow State University in 1990 under the supervision of Vladimir Arnold (Thesis: Normal forms and versal deformations of evolution differential equations).

In 1997 he was awarded the Aisenstadt Prize.

Boris Khesin specializes in instructing high-level calculus, including trigonometric functions, inverse function theorem, differentiation, integration, and fundamental theorem of calculus.

References 

Russian mathematicians
1964 births
Living people
Moscow State University alumni
Soviet mathematicians
Canadian mathematicians